A power flash is a flash of light caused by arcing electrical discharges from damaged electrical equipment, most often severed or arcing power lines. They are often caused by strong winds, especially those from tropical cyclones and tornadoes, and occasionally by intense downbursts and derechoes. Storm spotters and meteorologists use these flashes to spot tornadoes which would otherwise be invisible due to rain or darkness. They can be distinguished from lightning by the fact that they originate at ground level, the blue or green color of the flash, and depending on distance, the sound of high-voltage lines shorting out.

See also

 Electric discharge
 Electric arc

References

External links
 Power Flashes in a Giant Tornado
 Lightning dictionary

Tornado
Electric arcs
Electrical phenomena
Weather hazards